Cnemaspis uttaraghati is a species of diurnal, rock-dwelling, insectivorous gecko endemic to  India. It is distributed in Maharashtra.

References

 Cnemaspis uttaraghati

uttaraghati
Reptiles of India
Reptiles described in 2021
Taxa named by Ishan Agarwal
Taxa named by Akshay Khandekar